The 2017 Youth Beach Handball World Championship was the first edition of IHF Youth Beach Handball World Championship organised by the Mauritius Handball Association under the auspices of the International Handball Federation. The event was held in Flic-en-Flac, Mauritius from 11 to 16 July 2017. It was played in under-17 years category. It also acted as a qualification tournament for the 2018 Summer Youth Olympics which was held in Buenos Aires (Argentina).

Bidding process
The International Handball Federation received three bids from Croatia, Hong Kong China and Mauritius for the hosting of 1st IHF Youth (U-17) Beach Handball World Championship. The bids were analyzed by the IHF Beach Handball Working Group. According to the recommendations of the IHF Beach Handball Working Group, the U17 Beach Handball World Championships 2017 should be organized in a country outside Europe to widen the geographical borders of handball. Mauritius offers natural beaches and good climate conditions as well as hotels in walking distance to the venue. The IHF Beach Handball Working Group graded the bidders according to their bidding concept and participation fee per person/per day follows: Croatia 90%, Hong Kong 90% and Mauritius 95%.

The IHF Council unanimously awarded the 1st IHF Youth (U-17) Beach Handball World Championships to the Mauritius on 23 July 2016 in a meeting held in Bratislava (Slovakia) on the recommendation of the IHF Beach Handball Working Group.

Format
The sixteen teams were split into four groups of four teams. After playing a round-robin, the three top ranked team advanced to the main round. Every team kept the points from preliminary round matches against teams who also advance. In the main round every team had three games against the opponents they did not face in the preliminary round. The top four teams of main round will advanced to the quarterfinals.

All matches shall be played in 2 X 10 minutes with a half – time of 5 minutes. The team that wins two sets is the winner of a match, according to the official IHF Rules for Beach Handball. Points are awarded as follows:
 Win = 2 points
 Defeat = 0 points

Tie-breaking criterion

If two or more teams have gained the same number of points, after the group matches have been completed, classification is decided as follows:

(i) Results in points between the teams concerned

(ii) Periods difference in the matches between the teams concerned

(iii) Goal points difference in the matches between the teams concerned

(iv) Greater number of plus goal points in the matches between the teams concerned

(v) If the teams are still equal, a decision is made between those teams with equal number of points, as long as the contested place is not the last place within the group, as follows

(vi) Periods difference is subtracted in all matches

(vii) Greater number of plus periods in all matches

(viii) Goal point’s difference is subtracted in all matches

(ix) Greater number of plus goal points in all matches

(x) If classification still is not possible, a draw shall decide. The IHF representative on site shall execute the draw, if possible in the presence of the “responsible team official”. If the “responsible team official” cannot be present, other co-workers selected by IHF shall take part in draw.

Qualification criterion for the 2018 Summer Youth Olympics

To be eligible to participate in the 2018 Summer Youth Olympics, athletes must have been born between 1 January 2000 and 31 December 2002. Nine (9) quota places will be allocated at the 2017 Youth Beach Handball World Championship to the top ranked teams of the respective continents according to the distribution below:
 One country from Africa
 Two countries from Asia
 Three countries from Europe
 Two countries from Pan-America
 One country from Oceania
The host country of the YOG 2018, Argentina should decide which gender they are going to participate in YOG 2018. For any unused host country places reallocation of unused quota places is valid. According to the Buenos Aires 2018 Qualification Systems Principles, participation in team sports shall be limited to one women’s and one men’s team per NOC across team sports (Football, Handball, Hockey, and Rugby) with the exception of the Host Country who can enter one team per sport.
Reallocation of unused qualification places
If a quota place allocated is not confirmed by the NOC by the confirmation of quota place deadline or is declined by the NOC, the quota place will be reallocated to the next best-ranked NOC from the respective continent not yet qualified from the Youth Beach Handball World Championship. If the quota place is still available, it will be reallocated to the best-ranked NOC from the respective continent not yet qualified in the IHF Beach Handball Senior Ranking, of 20 July 2017. If the quota place is still available, it will be reallocated to the best-ranked NOC not yet qualified in the IHF Beach Handball Senior Ranking, of 20 July 2017.

Reallocation of unused host country places
Any unused host country place (returned or achieved through the 2017 Youth Beach Handball World Championship) will be reallocated to the next best-ranked NOC not yet qualified from the Pan-American continent at the 2017 Youth Beach Handball World Championship. If the quota place is still available, it will be reallocated to the best-ranked NOC from Pan-America not yet qualified in the IHF Beach Handball Senior Ranking, of 20 July 2017. If the quota place is still available, it will be reallocated to the best-ranked NOC not yet qualified in the IHF Beach Handball Senior Ranking, of 20 July 2017.

Draw
The draw was held on 17 May 2017. Draw was conducted by Mr. Giampiero Masi (Italy), Chairman of the IHF Beach Handball Working Group.

Seeding
Men

Women

Referees
Following 9 referee pairs were selected for the championship:

Men

Group A

Group B

Group C

Group D

Main round

Group I

Group II

Consolation Group

9th–15th Placement matches

13th–15th Placement matches

9th–12th Placement matches

11th–12th-place match

9th–10th-place match

Championship bracket

Final standings

Women

Group A

Group B

Group C

Group D

Main round

Group I

Group II

Consolation Group

9th–14th placement matches

12th–14th placement matches

9th–11th placement matches

Championship bracket

Final standings

Controversies
Two days before the departure of the IHF nominees to Mauritius, the International Handball Federation received a letter from the President of Mauritius Handball Federation (MHF) asking for a support of CHF 300,000, in addition to the participation fees, to meet the expenses of the organisation of the Championship. The request was declined by the IHF, asking the President of Mauritius Handball Federation to fulfil the provisions of the signed championship contract. Accommodation for both the teams and IHF nominees was below IHF standards, and that the MHF failed to pay off the company that provided services of accommodation, catering and flight booking. Eventually, the IHF paid for the entire accommodation of the teams as well as the nominees after price negotiations made by the Managing Director.

In the terms of transportation, the organiser did not fulfil the agreed concept of transportation for the teams, but following an intervention of the Minister of Sports Mr. Stephan Toussaint more vehicles were made available. In addition, the three venues were not constructed while the main venue was not completely done. The Chairman of the IHF Beach Handball Working Group was authorised by President Moustafa to negotiate the price of the venue construction; and eventually four venues were reduced to three and the IHF nominees were cleaning and setting up the two venues to reduce the cost. Due to the absence of the Local Organising Committee, including the President and remaining representatives of Mauritius Handball Federation, at the event, the full organisation was taken over by the IHF. 

As for the competition, both Brazilian teams and the Togolese women’s team withdrew their participation shortly before the event. 

Due to the payments made by the IHF an amount of CHF 173,619.27 needs to be reimbursed to the IHF by Mauritius Handball Federation. The IHF Executive Committee proposed in its meeting in Tbilisi on 17 August 2017 to wait for an official communication from Mauritius Handball Federation to explain the situation occurred before submitting the issue to the IHF legal bodies for further decisions.

References

External links
Official website 

Youth Beach Handball World Championship
Youth Beach World Championship
Hand
International sports competitions hosted by Mauritius
July 2017 sports events in Africa
Beach